Argentina was one of the founding members of the South American Games participating in the very first edition held in La Paz, Bolivia in 1978. It is the most successful country in the competition having a total of 2044 medals and has led the medal table seven times in nine editions.

Argentina is represented by the Argentine Olympic Committee and have host this event twice in 1982 and 2006 in the cities of Rosario and Buenos Aires respectively.

Medal count

Medals by games

Medals by sport

References

South American Games